Kerala Gramin Bank (KGB) is a Regional Rural Bank (RRB), headquartered at Malappuram in Kerala, India. The bank is jointly owned by Central and State Governments & sponsored by Canara Bank. It is under the ownership of Ministry of Finance , Government of India.

The bank was formed by amalgamating North Malabar Gramin Bank and South Malabar Gramin Bank in 2013. It is currently having 634 branches in Kerala and 324 ATMs with a total business of 38000+ crore, as of 2021.

See also

 Banking in India
 List of banks in India
 Reserve Bank of India
 Regional Rural Bank
 Indian Financial System Code
 List of largest banks
 List of companies of India
 Make in India
 Kerala Bank

References

External links

Regional rural banks of India
Banks based in Kerala
Banks established in 2013
2013 establishments in Kerala
Indian companies established in 2013